Han Zheng (born 22 April 1954) is a Chinese politician serving as the current Vice President of the People's Republic of China since 2023. He previously served as Senior Vice Premier of the State Council from 2018 to 2023. He has also been leader of the Central Leading Group on Hong Kong and Macau Affairs since April 2018. From 2017 to 2022, he served as a member of the Politburo Standing Committee of the Chinese Communist Party (CCP). Han served as Deputy Party Secretary and Mayor of Shanghai between 2003 and 2012. In November 2012, he was promoted to become the Party Secretary of Shanghai, the top political post in the city, and also gained a seat on the CCP Politburo. On March 10 2023, Han Zheng who left the politburo standing committee in 2022, became the vice president of China.

Han was once considered a member of the Shanghai clique, headed by former Party General Secretary Jiang Zemin.

Early career
He was born in Shanghai, but traces his ancestry to Cixi, in neighbouring Zhejiang province. He began work as a labourer at a warehouse in the latter years of the Cultural Revolution. He joined the Chinese Communist Party in 1979. He then worked at a chemical equipment company in an administrative role. Beginning in 1986, Han began working as a senior administrator at the municipal chemical engineering college, then worked as party secretary at the Shanghai Rubber Shoe Factory. By 1988, Han oversaw the party organization at the Shanghai Greater China Rubber Shoe Factory, and was praised by then Shanghai mayor Zhu Rongji.

In June 1990, Han officially entered the Communist Youth League organization of Shanghai, and would rise to become its deputy secretary in charge of day-to-day work, then elevated to secretary (head) in 1991. In November 1992 he was named governor of Luwan District. During his tenure in the district, Han spearheaded the Huaihai Road revitalization initiative, transforming the street to a glamorous shopping destination.  Han also focused on fixing the ecology of the district and expanding its green spaces. He then obtained a master's degree from East China Normal University and earned the title of senior economist.

In July 1995, Han was named deputy secretary-general of the Shanghai municipal government, during which he was in charge of a committee on the economy, the municipal planning commission, and the director of the office in charge of securities regulations. In December 1997, he was named a member of the municipal Party Standing Committee for the first time, entering sub-provincial ranks. In February 1998 he was named vice-mayor of Shanghai; in May 2002 he was named Deputy Party Secretary of Shanghai.

Han joined the Central Committee of the Chinese Communist Party at the 16th Party Congress in 2002. In 2003 he was named the Mayor of Shanghai at age 48, the youngest Mayor the city has seen in fifty years. A vocal advocate of the Shanghai real estate boom, Han has a largely positive image with the Shanghai citizenry for his openness and transparency. However, because he served under Chen Liangyu, the CCP Shanghai Secretary at the time, Han supported many of Chen's policies, notably those favouring Shanghai's regional development, in contrast to a more balanced approach favoured by the national leadership.

Leading Shanghai

On 25 September 2006, Han became the acting Party Committee Secretary of Shanghai after the dismissal of Chen Liangyu over corruption probes during the Shanghai pension scandal. With what were believed to be stern messages sent by Party general secretary Hu Jintao, Han led a municipal task force to crack down on the corruption in Shanghai, and has since then been believed to be a Hu loyalist. His tenure as the interim party secretary in Shanghai lasted a mere five months, when on 24 March 2007, Xi Jinping was 'parachuted' into the office of Shanghai Party Secretary from the same post in the neighbouring province of Zhejiang. Xi later became the member of CCP Politburo Standing Committee after 17th Party Congress in October 2007. Han proved to be a 'political survivor' however, having served under party secretaries Chen Liangyu, Xi Jinping, and Yu Zhengsheng in the Mayor's office.

Han assumed the party secretary post in November 2012, shortly after the conclusion of the 18th Party Congress, and also gained a seat on the 18th Politburo of the Chinese Communist Party.

First Vice-Premier 
Han was chosen to be a member of the 19th CCP Politburo Standing Committee, China's top decision-making body, at the 1st Plenary Session of the 19th Central Committee of the Chinese Communist Party on 25 October 2017.
In March 2018 the National People's Congress appointed him first-ranked Vice-Premier of the State Council. He succeeded as leader of the Central Leading Group on Hong Kong and Macau Affairs in April 2018.

In March 2021, Han said that electoral reforms in Hong Kong, designed to reduce the power of district councillors and to increase the power of the election committee, were being implemented to "prevent subversion."

On October 23, 2022, Han Zheng retired from the CCP politburo standing committee in the first plenary session of the 20th Central Committee of the Chinese Communist Party, at the age of 68.

Vice President 
On March 10, 2023, Han Zheng was elected as the Vice President of China.

Notes

References

1954 births
Living people
Chinese Communist Party politicians from Shanghai
Delegates to the 19th National Congress of the Chinese Communist Party
Delegates to the 20th National Congress of the Chinese Communist Party
Delegates to the 10th National People's Congress
Delegates to the 11th National People's Congress
Delegates to the 12th National People's Congress
Delegates to the 13th National People's Congress
Delegates to the 14th National People's Congress
East China Normal University alumni
First vice premiers of the People's Republic of China
Fudan University alumni
Mayors of Shanghai
Members of the 16th Central Committee of the Chinese Communist Party
Members of the 17th Central Committee of the Chinese Communist Party
Members of the 18th Politburo of the Chinese Communist Party
Members of the 19th Politburo Standing Committee of the Chinese Communist Party
People's Republic of China politicians from Shanghai
Secretaries of the Communist Party Shanghai Committee
Vice presidents of the People's Republic of China